The Omaha Children's Museum is a nonprofit learning and exploration space for young people located at 500 South 20th Street in downtown Omaha, Nebraska. The museum has received a national award from the Association of Science and Technology Museums.

About 
Operated as a private nonprofit organization the mission of Omaha Children's Museum is to engage the imagination and create excitement about learning. The museum was founded in 1976 by Karen Levin, Jane Ford Hawthorne, Betty Hiller, and a group of local educators. It began as a traveling group of exhibits and activities, and today occupies a  space in Downtown Omaha. The museum has a Board of Directors composed of community members.

In 1989 the museum moved to its current and permanent home at 20th Street and St. Mary’s Ave. 
In 1993 Omaha Children's Museum completed the  renovation of the main floor (40,000 sq. feet) which included the Charlie Cambell Science and Technology Center.

In 2004 and 2010, the museum was honored with Leading Edge Awards for Visitor Experience from the Association of Science and Technology Museums. The museum’s director, Lindy J. Hoyer served on the Board of Directors for the national Association of Children's Museums.

Exhibits 
The Omaha Children's Museum renovated its permanent exhibits through the $6.6 million capital campaign entitled "Building on the Best". The permanent exhibits include the Creative Arts Center, which features a theater, Artist-in-Residence Studio, community sculpture and art island; the "Charlie Campbell Science and Technology Center", which houses the "Super Gravitron", a ball machine where balls powered by air wind and water travel through tubes and on rails, and an inventors workshop, pulley and vacuum chairs and the "Science Showplace" where live science presentations take place.

Other features include the "Imagination Playground", which is designed for young children; "Sandy’s Splish-Splash Garden", which is an interactive fountain area outside where kids can cool off. A  kinetic tower and four  whirligigs resembling giant pinwheels are located immediately outside the museum.

Janie York was the first artist in residence at the museum's Creative Arts Center in an ongoing program.  York explored a variety of textile arts, including community quilting and story quilting, as well as textile history and identification.

In addition to its permanent exhibits, Omaha Children’s Museum regularly features traveling exhibitions and educational programming in art, science and humanities. The museum's Science Lab has been featured on the PBS Kids website.

See also
 Culture in Omaha

References

External links
 Omaha Children's Museum website.

Museums in Omaha, Nebraska
Children's museums in Nebraska
Organizations based in Omaha, Nebraska
1976 establishments in Nebraska
Museums established in 1976